Kazakhstan first competed at the Asian Games in 1994.

Asian Games

Medals by Games

Asian Winter Games

*Red border color indicates tournament was held on home soil.

Medals by Games

Asian Para Games

Medals by Games

References